The 1848–49 United States Senate elections were held on various dates in various states. As these U.S. Senate elections were prior to the ratification of the Seventeenth Amendment in 1913, senators were chosen by state legislatures. Senators were elected over a wide range of time throughout 1848 and 1849, and a seat may have been filled months late or remained vacant due to legislative deadlock. In these elections, terms were up for the senators in Class 3.

The Democratic Party lost seats but maintained control of the Senate.

Results 
Senate party division, 31st Congress (1849–1851)
 Majority party: Democratic (33–36)
 Minority party: Whig Party (25–24)
 Other parties: Free Soil (2)
 Total seats: 60–62

Change in Senate composition

Before the elections

As a result of the elections 

Note: "Re-elected" includes incumbent appointee elected to the next term.

Beginning of the next Congress

Race summaries

Special elections during the 30th Congress 
In these special elections, the winners were seated during 1848 or in 1849 before March 4; ordered by election date.

Races leading to the 31st Congress 
In these regular elections, the winners were elected for the term beginning March 4, 1849; ordered by state.

All of the elections involved the Class 3 seats.

Elections during the 31st Congress 
In these elections, the winners were elected in 1849 after March 4.

Individual elections

Maryland 

Reverdy Johnson won election in 1844 but retired to become the United States Attorney General. In order to fill his seat, David Stewart was elected by an unknown margin of votes, for the Class 1 seat.

James Pearce won re-election by an unknown margin of votes, for the Class 3 seat.

New York 

The New York election was held February 6, 1849. Barnburner John Adams Dix had been elected in 1845 to this seat after the resignation of Silas Wright, and Dix's term would expire on March 3, 1849. In November 1848, Dix was the Barnburners/Free-Soilers candidate for Governor of New York, but was defeated by Whig Hamilton Fish.

At this time New York Democratic Party was split in two fiercely opposing factions: the Barnburners" and the "Hunkers". The Barnburners organized the Free Soil Party in 1848 and nominated Martin Van Buren for U.S. President. Due to the split, the Whig Party won most of the elective offices by pluralities.

At the State election in November 1847, 24 Whigs and 8 Democrats were elected for a two-year term (1848-1849) in the State Senate. At the State election in November 1848, 106 Whigs, 15 Free Soilers and 7 Hunkers were elected to the Assembly for the session of 1849. The 72nd New York State Legislature met from January 2 to April 11, 1849, at Albany, New York.

Ex-Governor of New York William H. Seward was nominated by a caucus of Whig State legislators on February 1, 1849. The vote was 88 for Seward, 12 for John A. Collier, 18 scattering and 4 blanks.  The incumbent U.S. Senator John Adams Dix ran for re-election supported by the Free Soilers.  Ex-Chancellor Reuben H. Walworth was the candidate of the Hunkers. Walworth had been third place in the last gubernatorial election, behind Fish and Dix.  Ex-Congressman Daniel D. Barnard (Whig) received 2 scattering votes in the Senate.  William H. Seward was the choice of both the Assembly and the Senate, and was declared elected.

Ohio

The two houses of the Ohio General Assembly met in joint session February 22, 1849, with 72 representatives and 35 senators present to elect a Senator (Class 3) to succeed incumbent William Allen. On the fourth ballot, Salmon P. Chase was elected with a majority of the votes cast, as follows:

The second ballot was declared a nullity by Speaker of the Senate Brewster Randall, because there were one more ballots cast than members present.

Pennsylvania 

The Pennsylvania election was held January 10, 1849. James Cooper was elected by the Pennsylvania General Assembly.

Incumbent Democrat Simon Cameron, who was elected in 1845, was not a candidate for re-election to another term. The Pennsylvania General Assembly, consisting of the House of Representatives and the Senate, convened on January 10, 1849, to elect a new Senator to fill the term beginning on March 4, 1849. Three ballots were recorded. The results of the third and final ballot of both houses combined are as follows:

|-
|-bgcolor="#EEEEEE"
| colspan="3" align="right" | Totals
| align="right" | 133
| align="right" | 100.00%
|}

See also
 1848 United States elections
 1848 United States presidential election
 1848–49 United States House of Representatives elections
 30th United States Congress
 31st United States Congress

Notes

References
 
 
 
The New York Civil List compiled in 1858 (see: pg. 63 for U.S. Senators; pg. 136 for State Senators 1849; pg. 236ff for Members of Assembly 1849)
Members of the 31st United States Congress
Result State election, 1847: The Whig Almanac and United States Register for 1848
Result Whig caucus: The American Whig Review, Vol. 11 by George Hooker Colton & James Davenport Whelpley (page 638)
Result U.S. Senate election, State Senate:  Journal of the Senate (72nd Session) (1849; pg. 167)
Result U.S. Senate election, State Assembly:  Journal of the Assembly (72nd Session) (1849; pg. 355f)
Pennsylvania Election Statistics: 1682-2006 from the Wilkes University Election Statistics Project